Vejle Fjord is an East Jutland-type fjord in Denmark. The fjord's generally calm surface waters are surrounded by low forested hills shaped by glaciers during the last ice age.

Public works projects have re-shaped the small rivers and countryside surrounding the fjord since the Middle Ages.

Highway E45 crosses the fjord just east of the town of Vejle on the Vejle Fjord Bridge.

See also
 Vejle
 Vejle Fjord Bridge
 Nakskov Fjord

References

Fjords of Denmark
Kattegat